Irina Gubkina (born April 19, 1972 in Leningrad) is a Russian luger who competed in the mid to late 1990s. Competing in two Winter Olympics, Obkircher earned her best finish of seventh in the women's singles event at Lillehammer in 1994.

References
1994 luge women's singles results
1998 luge women's singles results

1972 births
Living people
Lugers at the 1992 Winter Olympics
Lugers at the 1994 Winter Olympics
Lugers at the 1998 Winter Olympics
Soviet female lugers
Russian female lugers
Olympic lugers of the Unified Team
Olympic lugers of Russia